Alta Allen (born Alta Crowin) (September 6, 1904 – July 24, 1998) was an American actress.

Early years
Allen was born as Alta Crowin in Oakland, California in 1904 to a Scottish mother, Jessie (née Robertson), and W. J. Crowin, who hailed from the West Coast. She made her first professional performance at an Oakland theater in a production of Louisa May Alcott's Little Women. Allen's role in this production was as Beth March. She was ten years old at the time. 

Allen was "one of the most popular of Oakland's younger social set."

Career 
Allen's early professional experience included acting in stock theater in Oakland and directing and performing in the Fairmont's Rainbow Lane revue.

In 1920, William Fox, the founder of the Fox Film Corporation, observed Allen as she performed the leading role at a musical revue within the Fairmont Hotel. Subsequently, she signed a contract with his studios, although she would only perform one role in any silent film released by Fox Film: the 1921 comedy Skirts. She would subsequently sign a contract with Universal Studios, and later appeared in several films released by this corporation, including The Marriage Chance (1922), and A Self-Made Failure (1924). Her final credited screen appearance occurred in 1926, as Thora Barton in the cast of The Set-Up.

Personal life and death 
On November 25, 1920, Allen married actor, screenwriter, and director Hampton Del Ruth (the couple later divorced).  She died of natural causes at her Boonsboro home on June 24, 1998, the age of 93.

Filmography

References

External links

 

American silent film actresses
Actresses from Oakland, California
1904 births
1998 deaths
American people of Scottish descent
20th-century American actresses